Sir Geoffrey Malcolm Badger AO DSc FAA FRACI FTSE FACE FAIM (10 October 1916, Port Augusta, South Australia – 23 September 2002, Adelaide) was Professor of Organic Chemistry at the University of Adelaide from 1955 to 1964, and Vice-Chancellor of the University from 1967 to 1977.  He was elected Fellow of the Australian Academy of Science in 1960, appointed an Officer of the Order of Australia in 1975, and was knighted in 1979.  In retirement he wrote two books, "Explorers of the Pacific" (1988) and "The Explorers of Australia" (2001).

References

Australian Knights Bachelor
Officers of the Order of Australia
1916 births
2002 deaths
Fellows of the Australian Academy of Science
Australian chemists
Vice-Chancellors of the University of Adelaide
Presidents of the Australian Academy of Science
People educated at Trinity College (University of Melbourne)